Sepp is a surname. When borne by Estonian-descended people, it is usually derived from sepp meaning "smith". 

Notable people with this surname include:

 The Sepp publishing family, four generations of printers and artists active in Amsterdam between 1768 and 1860
 Adeele Sepp (born 1989), Estonian actress
 Andre Sepp (born 1971), Estonian politician
 Anna Maria Sepp (born 1996), Estonian sailor
 Boris Sepp (1894–1941), Estonian lawyer and politician
 Dennis Sepp (born 1973), Dutch footballer
 Evelyn Sepp (born 1972), Estonian sports figure and politician
 Jan Sepp (1778–1853), Dutch entomologist and artist
 Johann Nepomuk Sepp (1816–1909), German historian and politician
 Kalev Sepp, Estonian-American defense analyst
 Kätlin Sepp (born 1992), Estonian swimmer
 Kurt Sepp (born 1935), German ice hockey player
 Leo Sepp (1892–1941),  Estonian financial figure, writer and politician
 Olav Sepp (born 1969), Estonian chess champion
 Ott Sepp (born 1982), Estonian actor
 Sigrid Sepp (born 1998), Estonian swimmer
 Tõnu Sepp (born 1946), Estonian music teacher
 Uudo Sepp (born 1997), Estonian singer

See also 
 Seppä, a Finnish surname with the same meaning (smith).
 Sepp (given name)

Estonian-language surnames
German-language surnames
Occupational surnames